Tivadar Kardos (September 26, 1921 in Budapest – May 15, 1998) was a Hungarian chess composer and an author of chess-related material.

An academic by trade, he composed over 400 chess problems. He focused on two-move problems, as well as self- and helpmates. He was chairman of the Budapest Chess Problem Committee.  Together with István Rágó, from 1969 to 1976 he published the paper "Feladványkedvelők Lapja" (Paper of the Friends of Chess Problems).

1921 births
1998 deaths
Chess composers